The rolling stock of the Bodmin and Wenford Railway is the locomotives, carriages and wagons used on the Bodmin and Wenford Railway, a heritage railway in Cornwall, England, UK.

Locomotives 
Most of the locomotives operating on the Bodmin and Wenford Railway are Great Western Railway (GWR) steam locomotives and British Rail (BR) diesels typical of those that have operated in Cornwall and west Devon, along with shunting locomotives typical of industrial and military sites in the area.

Steam locomotives

Diesel locomotives

Diesel Multiple Units

Coaching stock 
Trains on the Bodmin and Wenford Railway are mostly formed from British Rail (BR) Mark 1 coaches but some GWR are also in use.

Goods wagons

Past members of the B&WR fleet 
Locomotives and multiple units which have been based on the Bodmin and Wenford Railway in the past. These lists do not include locomotives based on other lines that were short term visitors, for example to a gala weekend or for a season.

Steam

Diesel

References

External links

Bodmin & Wenford Railway - Meet the fleet

Bodmin And Wenford Railway